Gotstyle is a Toronto-based clothing retailer. The first store was opened in 2005 by owner Melissa Austria. Since then it expanded to two locations: 62 Bathurst St. and 21 Trinity St. in the Distillery District.

History 

The opening of the first store on King St. W was documented on Opening Soon aired on HGTV.

Awards & Recognitions 
 In 2015, it was listed on Sharp Magazine's "11 Most Unique Retailers Around the World".

References

Clothing retailers of Canada